Sanila may refer to:

 Sanila (lieutenant), a medieval Spanish lieutenant
 Sanila, Pakistan, a town in Pakistan
 Tiina Sanila, a Skolt Sámi rock star.